The Great Ocean Road Open was a new addition to the ATP Tour in 2021.

Jannik Sinner won the title, defeating Stefano Travaglia in the final, 7–6(7–4), 6–4.

Seeds
The top eight seeds received a bye into the second round. 

  David Goffin (second round)
  Karen Khachanov (semifinals)
  Hubert Hurkacz (quarterfinals)
  Jannik Sinner (champion)
  Nikoloz Basilashvili (second round)
  Reilly Opelka (third round)
  Miomir Kecmanović (quarterfinals)
  Alexander Bublik (third round)
  Tennys Sandgren (second round)
  Sam Querrey (second round)
  Jordan Thompson (quarterfinals)
  Laslo Đere (first round)
  Aljaž Bedene (third round)
  Pablo Andújar (first round)
  Vasek Pospisil (withdrew)
  Feliciano López (first round)

Draw

Finals

Top half

Section 1

Section 2

Bottom half

Section 3

Section 4

References

Main draw

2021 ATP Tour